The 1999 Japan Open Tennis Championships women's doubles was the women's doubles event of the twenty-fifth edition of the Japan Open; a WTA Tier III tournament held in Tokyo, Japan. Naoko Kijimuta and Nana Miyagi were the defending champions but did not compete that year.

Corina Morariu and Kimberly Po won in the final 6–3, 6–2 against Catherine Barclay and Kerry-Anne Guse.

Seeds

Draw

Finals

References

Doubles